Kotzenbüll is a municipality in the district of Nordfriesland, in Schleswig-Holstein, Germany.

See also
Eiderstedt peninsula

References

Nordfriesland